Christopher Jarvis (born 22 September 1944) is a South African cricketer. He played in eight first-class matches from 1974/75 to 1976/77.

References

External links
 

1944 births
Living people
South African cricketers
Border cricketers
Northerns cricketers
Cricketers from Johannesburg